Bryce Williams may refer to:

Bryce Williams (American football) (born 1993), American football tight end
Bryce Williams (rugby union) (born 1980), New Zealand rugby player
Bryce Williams, Tsawwassen First Nation Chief and Director on the Metro Vancouver Board
Bryce Williams, pseudonym of Vester Lee Flanagan (1973–2015), perpetrator of the murders of Alison Parker and Adam Ward

See also
William Bryce (1888–1963), Canadian politician
Williams (disambiguation)
Bryce (disambiguation)